Kaleshwar is a village and former Village Development Committee that is now part of Mahankal Rural Municipality in Province No. 3 of central Nepal. At the time of the 1991 Nepal census it had a population of 1429 living in 230 individual households.

References

External links
UN map of the municipalities of Lalitpur District

Populated places in Lalitpur District, Nepal